Arundhati is a 1967 Indian Oriya film directed by Prafulla Sengupta.

Synopsis 
Arundhati and Manoj are lovers and part of an Odissi dance troupe. Manoj desperately loves Arundhati. One day, while the troupe is performing in front of a packed audience, one Biswajeet claims Arundhati to be his wife Madhumati. Actually Madhumati died in a train accident, but Biswajeet still believes that Madhumati is still alive. In suspicion, Manoj leaves Arundhati and disappears. Arundhati tries to convince Biswajeet that she is not Madhmati and she has a deep love interest with Manoj. Later Biswajeet finds Madhumati and Arundhati are twin sisters and Madhumati actually died in an accident. Biswajeet left the troupe to search for Manoj. Biswajeet finds Manoj in a small railway station and persuades Manoj to reunite with Arundhati.

Cast
 Sarat Pujari as Manoj
Braja  as Biswajeet
Minati Mishra as Arundhati/Madhumati

Music 
The music of the film was composed  by Shantunu Mahapatra.
The tracks from the film include:

Awards & Participation 
National Film Award for Best Feature Film in Oriya(1967) - President's medal for best Odia film Odia

References

External links
 

1967 films
1960s Odia-language films